Knighton is a hamlet part of the parish of Adbaston in the county of Staffordshire, England.

Knighton is situated close to the Staffordshire/Shropshire border in undulating agricultural land featuring a not inconsiderable number of endemic hardwood trees. Another feature is the Shropshire Union Canal, which passes through the hamlet at the point of a cutting and substantial embankment. Adjacent to the canal is the Knighton Reservoir, the function of which is to replenish its waters. 

Although a fundamentally agricultural community there is a food processing and packaging plant belonging to the food manufacturer Knighton Foods Ltd which processes and packs a wide range of products including Hot Beverages, Instant Desserts, Custards and Whips, Bakery Ingredients, Instant Milks, Coffee Creamers and Fat Powders. The factory maintains a social club, the facilities of which are available to the wider community for social events. The club's football pitch is home ground to the amateur Sunday football team Woodseaves FC, from the nearby village of Woodseaves, who play in the Stafford and District Sunday League.

The hamlet of Knighton has a royal decree attached to it, the effect of which is that all denizens shall be free of tax and tythe for ever more. Unfortunately over time this right has been slowly eroded to a point where now only denizens living within Knighton and engaged in agriculture can avail themselves of the rights bestowed by the decree. William Adams, who founded a grammar school at Newport, Shropshire in 1656, endowed this school with a large agricultural  estate at Knighton, providing income for future generations; as a result of this Knighton was exempt from all land taxes until 1990. The Knighton estate was eventually sold off in several portions over the course of the twentieth century, and the proceeds of the final sale were used by the Haberdashers' Company to purchase Longford Hall as a boarding house for the school.

The immediate area has a wealth of fauna and flora, buzzards and ravens often to be seen in the skies, otters have been reported in the areas water courses, deer occasionally to be seen in the surrounding fields and at least one "big cat" has not only been spotted within the parish but has effected a "kill", the victim being a young lamb.

See also
Listed buildings in Adbaston

References

External links

Hamlets in Staffordshire